This is a list of the heads of state of Iceland, from the foundation of the Kingdom of Iceland in 1918 to the present day.

From 1918 to 1944 the head of state under the Danish–Icelandic Act of Union was the Monarch, who was the same person as the Monarch of Denmark. Iceland became a republic under the Constitution of 1944 and the monarch was replaced by a ceremonial President.

Monarchs (1918–1944)
The succession to the throne of Iceland was the same as the succession to the throne of the Denmark.

External links

World Statesmen – Iceland

Government of Iceland
H